The Virginia House of Delegates election of 2015 was held on Tuesday, November 3. All 100 seats of the Virginia House of Delegates were on the ballot. While Republicans maintained an enormous edge against Democrats in the chamber, their net loss of one seat cost them their previously-held veto-proof majority against Governor Terry McAuliffe.

Background 
The filing deadline for Republicans and Democrats to participate in the June 9 primaries was March 26. Incumbents Mamye BaCote, Ed Scott, Tom Rust, Rob Krupicka, and David Ramadan announced their intent to retire from the House. Joseph E. Preston, Michael Futrell, and Scott Surovell chose to run for the 16th, 29th, and 36th district senate seats, respectively, rather than seek reelection. Freshman delegate and Tea Party activist Mark Berg was defeated in the Republican primary by Chris Collins, and twenty-year incumbent Johnny Joannou was defeated by Steve Heretick in the Democratic primary. Races were uncontested in sixty-two districts, and there was only one major party candidate on the ballot in seventy-one districts.

In October, a three-judge panel of the United States Court of Appeals for the Fourth Circuit upheld the boundaries of twelve House districts in a Democratic Party-supported lawsuit alleging racial gerrymandering.

Delegates not running for re-election

Results 
Democrats picked up two seats, with Jennifer Boysko and John Bell being elected to succeed the retiring Tom Rust and David Ramadan. Mark Dudenhefer gave the Republicans a single pickup when he won back the seat he lost two years earlier to Michael Futrell. For the first time since the Virginia Public Access Project started tracking state elections in 1995, every single incumbent running for reelection was successful.

Overall

By district

Seats that changed hands 
 Democratic to Republican (1)
 2nd district

 Republican to Democratic (2)
 86th district
 87th district

Aftermath

Reaction 
FairVote criticized the election results as demonstrative of Republican gerrymandering and the failures of winner-take-all voting. Stephen J. Farnsworth, a University of Mary Washington described the election in The Washington Post as a "tribute to gerrymandering," highlighting the lack of competitive races. The Democratic Party of Virginia framed "Democratic gains" in the House as having successfully "bucked the national trend as both a Southern state and presidential battleground state."

See also 
 2015 United States elections
 2015 Virginia elections
 2015 Virginia Senate election

References 

House of Delegates
November 2015 events in the United States
Virginia House of Delegates elections
Virginia House of Delegates